Kafri (also Romanized as Kafrī) is a village in Qarah Bagh Rural District, in the Central District of Shiraz County, Fars Province, Iran. At the 2006 census, its population was 1,636, in 390 families.

References 

Populated places in Shiraz County